The Man Outside is a 1933 British crime film directed by George A. Cooper and starring Henry Kendall, Gillian Lind and Joan Gardner. It was shot at Twickenham Studios in London and features sets designed by the art director James A. Carter. Made as a quota quickie, it was distributed by RKO Pictures. It is unrelated to the play The Man Outside, which was not written until 1946.

Plot summary
A criminal gang searches for stolen diamonds stashed in a country house following a major robbery.

Cast
 Henry Kendall as Harry Wainwright
 Gillian Lind as Ann
 Joan Gardner as Peggy Fordyce
 Michael Hogan as Shiner Talbot
 Cyril Raymond as Captain Fordyce
 John Turnbull as Inspector Jukes
 Louis Hayward as Frank Elford
 Ethel Warwick as Georgina Yapp

References

Bibliography
 Chibnall, Steve. Quota Quickies: The Birth of the British 'B' Film. British Film Institute, 2007.
 Low, Rachael. Filmmaking in 1930s Britain. George Allen & Unwin, 1985.
 Wood, Linda. British Films, 1927-1939. British Film Institute, 1986.

External links

1933 films
Films directed by George A. Cooper
1933 crime films
British crime films
Films shot at Twickenham Film Studios
British black-and-white films
1930s English-language films
1930s British films
Quota quickies
RKO Pictures films